Ammiraglio Magnaghi (A 5303) is a hydrographic survey vessel in service with Italian Navy.
It's the first survey vessel ever to be designed and built completely in Italy for the Marina Militare.
It has been regularly modernized and constantly upgraded (with MLU works, in 1990 and 2014/2016 years).

Characteristics 

It is fitted with:
 single-beam echo sounder, 33 and 210 kHz
 single-beam echo sounder Kongsberg EA600 to 12, 38 and 200 kHz
 multi-beam echo sounder  (50 kHz)
 side scan sonar hull-mounted (ELAC Seabeam 1050 MKII)
 side scan sonar towed (Klein 3900 )
 differential and RTK satellite positioning systems
 geodimeter
 portable tide gauge
 XBT bathythermograph
 CTD profiler with rosette system used for water sampling at different depths
 one ROV with closed circuit TV system
 one core barrel
 current meters
 Van Veen buckets
 weather station
 suitable digital data logging and processing systems interfaced with oceanographic and hydrographic sensors.
The ship is equipped with:
 three survey motor boats (8,6 m length) for coastal and shallow water surveys fitted with single beam and multi-beam echo sounder Simrad EM-3002
 harbour survey motor launch
 two dinghies.

References

External links
 Magnaghi (A 5303) Marina Militare website

Auxiliary ships of the Italian Navy
1974 ships
Ships built by Fincantieri
Ships built in La Spezia
Survey ships